Vyacheslav Anatolyevich Voronin; November 7, 1934, Zherdevsky District, Tambov Oblast, RSFSR, Soviet Union —  October 7, 2016, Kyiv, Ukraine) was a Soviet, Russian and Ukrainian actor. He was also a Merited Artist of Ukraine (2003).

Biography 
Born November 7, 1934 in the village of Chebizovka (now Zherdevka, Tambov Oblast).

A graduate of the actors faculty of VGIK. Since 1957 he has worked in the movie.

In 1985-1992 —  director of the Kyiv actors studio.

In his later years, he underwent several operations due to illness. He lived in Kyiv, Lisovyi masyv. He died on October 7, 2016.

Selected filmography
 The First Echelon (1955)  
 City Lights (1958)
 Kochubey (1958)
 Ivanna (1959)
 People of Мy Valley (1960)
 Clues from the Sky (1964)
 The Dream (1964)
 Wedding in Malinovka (1967)
 Liberation (1970)
 Guarneri Quartet (1978)
 Tenderness to the Roaring Beast (1982)
 Torpedo Bombers (1983)
 Reportage (1995)
 American  Blues (1995)
 Muhtar's Return 3 (2006)

Personal life
 His first wife —  actress Lidiya Fedoseyeva-Shukshina. Married since 1959 to 1963. In 1960 they had a daughter, Anastasia.
Granddaughter —  Laura Francisco.
The great-grandson —  Martin.
His second wife —  Svetlana. Son Vyacheslav (born 1973).

References

External links
 

Soviet male film actors
1934 births
2016 deaths
Russian male film actors
Soviet male television actors
Russian male television actors
Soviet male stage actors
Russian male stage actors
Ukrainian male stage actors
Ukrainian male television actors
Ukrainian male film actors
Recipients of the title of Merited Artist of Ukraine
Gerasimov Institute of Cinematography alumni